Kathy Gleason (born March 8, 1949) is an American gymnast. She competed in six events at the 1968 Summer Olympics.

References

External links
 

1949 births
Living people
American female artistic gymnasts
Olympic gymnasts of the United States
Gymnasts at the 1968 Summer Olympics
Sportspeople from Buffalo, New York
Pan American Games medalists in gymnastics
Pan American Games gold medalists for the United States
Pan American Games bronze medalists for the United States
Gymnasts at the 1967 Pan American Games
Medalists at the 1967 Pan American Games
20th-century American women